Gnod are a British rock band from Salford, Greater Manchester, England. Formed in 2006, the band was described in a review of its 2011 release Ingnodwetrust as "a collective from Manchester with an ever-rotating list of members." Its current lineup since 2012 is made up of key members Paddy Shine, Chris Haslam, Marlene Ribeiro, Alex Macarte and Andy Blundell, with a rotating cast of players, including drummers Jesse Webb and John Perry and vocalist Neil Francis. In addition to releasing its work on Rocket Recordings, the band's own Tesla Tapes label serves, according to its Bandcamp page, as "an outlet for musical projects and meanderings by Gnodheads past, present & future and friends of Gnod all over the world."

As part of its residency at the Islington Mill Art Academy, the band curated "Tangent", an installation by sound artist Callum Higgins. According to the academy's website, the event "transformed our club space into a fully immersive, light reactive environment. Using the PA system and light sensitive noise creating circuits people were directed into the room in small groups equipped with only a torch to guide them around. Their very presence and behaviour in the room manipulated and shaped their unique experience. The band also participates in a recurring shared club night at Islington Mill called Gesamtkunstwerk, (German for "whole arts work".) Reviewing a Gnod performance there, New Musical Express said, "this band are crazy good ... see them live now."

According to founding Gnod member Paddy Shine, Tesla Tapes takes its name from Nikola Tesla; band members cite such other non-musical influences as Kurt Vonnegut, David Simon, Graham Hancock and Rupert Sheldrake. Asked what the band would like to tell the world, Chris Haslam responds "Rebel! Rebel! We are many, they are few!"

Discography
· Gnod (2007)

· Chaudelande (2013)

· Mirror (2016)

· Infinity Machines (2015)

· Just Say No To The Psycho Right-Wing Capitalist Fascist Industrial Death Machine (2017)

· Be Aware of Your Limitations (2018)

· Easy to Build, Hard To Destroy (2021)

· La mort du sense (2021)

· Hexen Valley (2022)

References

External links 
 Gnod discography at Discogs
 Video of Islington Mill Studio performance from Islington Mill tumblr page
 Gnod at BBC Playlister

English psychedelic rock music groups
English indie rock groups
English space rock musical groups